Jasper is an unincorporated community in eastern Newton Township, Pike County, Ohio, United States.  It has a post office with the ZIP code 45642.  It lies at the intersection of State Routes 32, 104, and 124 along the banks of the Scioto River.

History
Jasper was platted by Robert Lucas on the Ohio and Erie Canal.

Education
Scioto Valley Local School District operates Jasper Elementary School in the community.

Gallery

References

Unincorporated communities in Ohio
Unincorporated communities in Pike County, Ohio